

Walter Boenicke (15 December 1895 – 21 April 1947) was a German general (General der Flieger) in the Luftwaffe during World War II who commanded the 3. Flieger Division.  He was a recipient of the Knight's Cross of the Iron Cross. Boenicke surrendered to the British troops in May 1945 and committed suicide on 21 April 1947.

Awards

 Knight's Cross of the Iron Cross on 14 May 1944 as Generalleutnant and commander of 3. Flieger-Division

References

Citations

Bibliography

 
 
 

1895 births
1947 deaths
People from Ballenstedt
People from the Province of Saxony
Luftwaffe World War II generals
German Army personnel of World War I
Recipients of the Gold German Cross
Recipients of the Knight's Cross of the Iron Cross
German prisoners of war in World War II held by the United Kingdom
German military personnel who committed suicide
Recipients of the clasp to the Iron Cross, 1st class
Generals of Aviators
Military personnel from Saxony-Anhalt